All Trinidad Sugar Estates and Factory Workers Union, founded by Adrian Cola Rienzi was the major sugar workers' trade union and the predominant Indo-Trinidadian voice in organised labour in Trinidad and Tobago between the 1930s and 1970s.  Leadership of the trade union passed from Rienzi to the Vice President, McDonald Moses, then Bhadase Sagan Maraj, and later to Krishna Gowandan.

The ATSEFWU was displaced by the All Trinidad Sugar and General Workers' Trade Union led by Basdeo Panday.

See also
 List of trade unions
 All Trinidad Sugar and General Workers' Trade Union

Defunct trade unions of Trinidad and Tobago